The Blackwater Lightship is a 2004 Hallmark Hall of Fame made-for-television drama film adaptation of the novel The Blackwater Lightship by acclaimed Irish author Colm Tóibín. It aired on CBS on February 4, 2004. The movie stars Angela Lansbury, Gina McKee, Sam Robards, Dianne Wiest, and Keith McErlean. Lansbury received an Emmy nomination for it in 2004.

Cast 
 Dianne Wiest as Lily Devereux Breen
 Gina McKee as Helen Breen O'Doherty
 Keith McErlean as Declan Breen
 Angela Lansbury as Dora Devereux
 Marijka Bardin as Young Helen Breen
 Sean Campion as Michael Breen
 Barry Cassin as Fr. Griffin
 Angela Harding as Mrs. Byrne
 Laura Hughes as Anne
 Ruth McCabe as Dr. Louise
 Frank McCusker as Harry
 Maria McDermottroe as Madge Kehoe
 Dearbhla Molloy as Essie Kehoe
 Brían F. O'Byrne as Larry
 Kevin O'Dwyer as Young Declan Breen
 David Parnell as Dr. Kerwin
 Sam Robards as Paul
 Macdara Ó Fátharta (billed as Macdara O'Fatharta) as Grandad

Notes
This was the first and only Hallmark Hall of Fame movie to be aired on a Wednesday instead of a Sunday, due to CBS airing the Super Bowl XXXVIII on Sunday, February 1.
This is also the second Hallmark Hall of Fame movie in which Angela Lansbury stars in, the first being The Shell Seekers.

References

External links
The Blackwater Lightship at the Internet Movie Database

2004 television films
2004 films
2004 drama films
Hallmark Hall of Fame episodes
Films based on Irish novels
American drama television films
Films directed by John Erman
Films scored by John Morris
English-language Irish films
2000s American films